Eric Dirk Oelschlägel (born 20 September 1995) is a German professional footballer who plays as a goalkeeper for Eredivisie club Emmen. He started his career with Werder Bremen, where he spent four seasons with the club's reserves. After two years with Borussia Dortmund he joined FC Utrecht in 2020. He joined FC Emmen in July 2022.

Club career
Oelschlägel began his career in 2001 at Dynamo Dresden. From 2006 to 2008 he played for SG Dresden Striesen, before returning to Dynamo. In 2012, he joined the youth system of Werder Bremen. In the 2014–15 season Oelschlägel moved to the second team, who at that time played in the Regionalliga Nord making his debut on 16 November 2014 debut in a 4–0 away win against FT Braunschweig. In 2015, he celebrated promotion to the 3. Liga with the second team.

After Oelschlägel went to the first team's training camp in Neuruppin in July 2015, he signed a professional contract with Bremen in January 2016 which lasts until 30 June 2018. With multiple goalkeepers injured, Oelschlägel was Felix Wiedwald's backup in the first team's match against Schalke on 24 January 2016. Having suffered an injury early in the first half of the 2015–16 season he played most second-team matches in the second half of the season.

On 20 June 2018, Oelschlägel signed for Borussia Dortmund on a one-year deal from Werder Bremen for an undisclosed fee as third choice keeper, playing for Borussia Dortmund second team in the Regionalliga West. In February 2019, he played his first match with the first-team, appearing against his former club Werder Bremen in the DFB-Pokal with first and second goalkeepers Roman Bürki and Marwin Hitz not fit to play. Oelschlägel made multiple saves during the match before making a mistake which resulted in Werder Bremen equalising for 3–3 in extra-time. Werder Bremen went through on penalties with Oelschlägel unable to save a penalty.

On 5 October 2020, Oelschlägel moved to FC Utrecht on a free transfer, having agreed a one-year contract.

On 15 July 2022, Oelschlägel joined FC Emmen on a two-year deal.

International career
Oelschlägel was selected as an alternate player in the German Olympic team's squad for the football tournament at the 2016 Summer Olympics in Rio de Janeiro. He remained inactive until the gold medal match, when manager Horst Hrubesch called him up in place of midfielder Leon Goretzka, who was injured in the team's opening match of the tournament. Though he was not used in the match, he earned a silver medal after Germany lost to Brazil in a penalty shoot-out.

Career statistics

Honours
Werder Bremen II
 Promotion to the 3. Liga: 2015

Borussia Dortmund
 DFL-Supercup: 2019

Germany
 Summer Olympic Games: Silver Medal, 2016

References

External links
 
 Eric Oelschlägel on kicker.de 
 
 
 

1995 births
Living people
People from Hoyerswerda
Footballers from Saxony
German footballers
Association football goalkeepers
3. Liga players
Regionalliga players
Eredivisie players
SV Werder Bremen players
SV Werder Bremen II players
Borussia Dortmund players
Borussia Dortmund II players
FC Utrecht players
FC Emmen players
German expatriate footballers
Expatriate footballers in the Netherlands
German expatriate sportspeople in the Netherlands
Footballers at the 2016 Summer Olympics
Olympic footballers of Germany
Olympic silver medalists for Germany
Medalists at the 2016 Summer Olympics
Olympic medalists in football